Avocado weevil may refer to one of a number of pest species known to cause harm to avocados.

Conotrachelus aguacatae
Conotrachelus perseae
Copturus aguacatae
Diaprepes abbreviatus
Heilipus apiatus
Heilipus luari

Animal common name disambiguation pages